Melvyn Doremus (born 29 October 1996) is a professional footballer who plays as a midfielder for Championnat National 2 club Chambly. Born in France, he plays for the Benin national team.

International career
Doremus was first called up to the Benin national team in November 2019 for a game against Sierra Leone, but did not play. He made his international debut on 2 September 2021 in a World Cup qualifier against Madagascar, a 1–0 away victory. He started and played the full game.

References

External links
 
 

1996 births
Footballers from Val-d'Oise
French sportspeople of Beninese descent
Citizens of Benin through descent
Living people
Beninese footballers
Benin international footballers
French footballers
Association football midfielders
Entente SSG players
Football Club 93 Bobigny-Bagnolet-Gagny players
Red Star F.C. players
FC Chambly Oise players
Championnat National players
Championnat National 2 players
Black French sportspeople